The Cleveland Guardians farm system consists of seven Minor League Baseball affiliates across the United States and in the Dominican Republic. Four teams are independently owned, while three—the Arizona Complex League Guardians and two Dominican Summer League Guardians squads—are owned by the major league club.

The Guardians, named the Indians until November 2021, have been affiliated with the Double-A Canton–Akron Indians/Akron Aeros/RubberDucks of the Eastern League since 1989, making it the longest-running active affiliation in the organization among teams not owned by the Guardians. This is also the longest affiliation in the team's history. Their newest affiliate is the Lynchburg Hillcats of the Carolina League, which became the Guardians' Class A-Advanced club in 2015, and were reassigned to Single-A in 2021.

2021–present
The current structure of Minor League Baseball is the result of an overall contraction of the system by Major League Baseball beginning with the 2021 season. Class A was reduced to two levels: High-A (formerly Class A-Advanced) and Single-A (formerly Class A; known as "Low-A" for the 2021 season). Class A Short Season teams and domestic Rookie League teams that operated away from MLB spring training facilities were eliminated. Prior to the 2021 season, Lake County was promoted to High-A from Single-A, while Lynchburg was demoted from High-A to Single-A. As of the 2021 season, the Indians/Guardians field only one Arizona Complex League team at their spring training facility, while fielding two teams in the Dominican Summer League.

1990–2020
This structure of Minor League Baseball was in effect from the 1990 season, when the Class A level was subdivided for a second time with the creation of Class A-Advanced, through the 2020 season. The Rookie level consisted of domestic and foreign circuits.

1963–1989
The foundation of the minors' current structure was the result of a reorganization initiated by Major League Baseball (MLB) before the 1963 season. The reduction from six classes to four (Triple-A, Double-AA, Class A, and Rookie) was a response to the general decline of the minors throughout the 1950s and early-1960s when leagues and teams folded due to shrinking attendance caused by baseball fans' preference for staying at home to watch MLB games on television. The only change made within the next 27 years was Class A being subdivided for the first time to form Class A Short Season in 1966.

1929–1962
The minors operated with six classes (Triple-A, Double-A, and Classes A, B, C, and D) from 1946 to 1962. The Pacific Coast League (PCL) was reclassified from Triple-A to Open in 1952 due to the possibility of becoming a third major league. This arrangement ended following the 1957 season when the relocation of the National League's Dodgers and Giants to the West Coast killed any chance of the PCL being promoted. The 1963 reorganization resulted in the Eastern and South Atlantic Leagues being elevated from Class A to Double-A, five of seven Class D circuits plus the ones in B and C upgraded to A, and the Appalachian League reclassified from D to Rookie.

References

External links
 Major League Baseball Prospect News: Cleveland Indians
 Baseball-Reference: Cleveland Indians League Affiliations

Minor league affiliates